M V Govindan, popularly known as Govindan Master, is an Indian politician who is the current Secretary of the Communist Party of India (Marxist), Kerala State Committee, the highest office within the party at the state level, since 2022. He previously served as the State Minister for Local self-governments and Excise in the Second Vijayan Ministry from 2021 to 2022. 

He became the member of CPI(M) in 1970. He was one of the founding members of DYFI, the youth organisation associated with CPI(M). Prior to that he was KSYF Kannur President and Secretary. He was one of the five members from Kerala in the all India preparatory committee of DYFI formation. He became DYFI's first Kerala State President and later as its secretary. He participated in 1986 Moscow Youth conference.

He was the Kasaragod area secretary of CPI(M) when it was still part of Kannur district. Govindan Master was arrested during the emergency and put in jail. He was tortured by police during that time. In 1991, he became CPI(M) state committee member after the state conference in Kozhikkode. He was elected to CPI(M) state secretariat during 2006. He had represented Taliparamba in Kerala legislative assembly during 1996 and 2001. He was Kannur district secretary of CPI(M) between 2002 and 2006. He had also become Ernakulam district secretary of CPI(M). Also, he was the Chief Editor of Deshabhimani, organ of CPI(M) Kerala.

Personal life

He was born to late K. Kunjambu and late M. V. Madhavi Amma at Morazha in Kannur on 23 April 1953. His spouse, P. K. Shyamala is the Chairperson of Anthoor Municipality and Kannur district committee member of CPI(M). He has two sons named Shyamjith & Rangeeth. He was working as Physical Education Teacher at Iringal UP School when he became active in politics and took voluntary retirement from the job.

References 

Communist Party of India (Marxist) politicians from Kerala
People from Kannur district
Malayali politicians
Living people
1953 births
Kerala MLAs 1991–1996